TSV Abbehausen is a German association football club from Abbehausen in the city of Nordenham, Lower Saxony.

History
The club was established in 1861 as the men's gymnastics club Männerturnverein Abbehausen. After World War II it was reestablished under the name Turn- und Sportverein Abbehausen 1861.

Today TSV is a multi sport club with departments for badminton, beach volleyball, fistball, swimming, gymnastics, and other recreational activities. The football section was not established until 1950.

The footballers most notable achievement was an appearance in the opening round of the 1975–76 DFB-Pokal (German Cup) where they were put out 0:5 by SV Union Salzgitter.

References

External links
Official team site
Das deutsche Fußball-Archiv historical German domestic league tables 

Football clubs in Germany
Football clubs in Lower Saxony
Association football clubs established in 1950
Sports clubs established in 1861
1861 establishments in Germany